This is a discography of Scottish recording artist Shirley Manson, who has performed as the lead singer of American rock band Garbage since 1994. Before then, she was a backing vocalist and keyboard player for Goodbye Mr Mackenzie from 1981 to 1992. The band had one UK Top 40 single, "The Rattler". Manson was then signed as a solo artist, performing under the name Angelfish with some members of Goodbye Mr Mackenzie, releasing Angelfish in the early 1990s.

A few months into Garbage's hiatus, Manson began writing a solo record, working with musician Paul Buchanan, producer Greg Kurstin, and film composer David Arnold. In 2007, Manson collaborated with Rivers Cuomo of Weezer, who at that point had never co-written material with anyone. Manson presented some of her work to Geffen Records in 2008, who found it "too noir", prompting Manson and Geffen to mutually terminate her contract. Manson continued to write material while without a record deal and was in talks with David Byrne and Ray Davies about a potential collaboration. Manson posted three demos on her Facebook profile, written by her and Kurstin, titled "In the Snow", "Pretty Horses" and "Lighten Up". 

Manson also worked with a number of artists outside of her solo project, reciting a verse of a long poem for a Chris Connelly album, co-writing and recording a duet with Eric Avery for his solo debut, recording with Debbie Harry and performing backing vocals on a Gavin Rossdale track. Although not recording material with them, Manson also performed on-stage with The Pretenders, Iggy Pop, Incubus and Kings of Leon in Atlantic City, with Gwen Stefani and a further twice with No Doubt in Universal City. Manson also performed in an uncredited role as a dominatrix in the music video for She Wants Revenge's single "These Things".

Studio albums

With Goodbye Mr. Mackenzie and Angelfish (1989–1994)

With Garbage (1995–present)

Singles

Released with Goodbye Mr Mackenzie

Released with Angelfish

Released with Garbage

Promotional singles

I  "Supervixen" was released to Modern Rock radio in the United States in October 1996. 
II  "Temptation Waits" was released to national radio in Spain in June 1999. 
III  The entry for "Bleed Like Me" that charted on the Hot Dance Music/Club Play chart was credited "Bleed Like Me (E. Kupper Mixes)".
 A  Charted only on the Hot 100 Airplay chart.
 B  Charted only on the Hot 100 Bubbling Under chart.
 C  Charted only on the Hot 100 Rock Chart.
 D  Charted only on the Hot 100 Dance Chart.

Shirley Manson & Serj Tankian single

See also
Garbage discography

Notelist

References

Discographies of British artists
Alternative rock discographies